Geoffrey Allan Khan FBA (born 1 February 1958) is a British linguist who has held the post of Regius Professor of Hebrew at the University of Cambridge since 2012. He has published grammars for the Aramaic dialects of Barwari, Qaraqosh, Erbil, Sulaymaniyah and Halabja in Iraq; of Urmia and Sanandaj in Iran; and leads the North-Eastern Neo-Aramaic Database .

Biography 

Khan was born and raised in Middlesbrough in North Yorkshire. His mother was English whereas his father was South Asian of Iranian descent. His paternal grandfather was an Ismaili Muslim who married a Catholic, and Geoffrey's father went to a Jesuit school in Bombay. One of his paternal great-grandmothers was the daughter of a Welsh Wesleyan missionary, and Khan also has Native American ancestry. His parents separated when he was quite young and he was raised by his mother and grandmother. He went to a "rough" comprehensive school where he suffered from racial abuse, and "took refuge in learning languages".

In 1984, he gained his Ph.D. from the School of Oriental and African Studies with a thesis entitled Extraposition and Pronominal Agreement in Semitic Languages. He became a researcher at the Cambridge University Library (1983-1993), working on the Cairo Genizah manuscripts. He  then joined the University of Cambridge’s Faculty of Asian and Middle Eastern Studies in 1993. In 2002, he was appointed Professor of Semitic Philology in Cambridge.

His main area of research is in linguistics studies of Hebrew and Aramaic while the focus of his Aramaic research is on North-Eastern Neo-Aramaic Dialects.

Honours 
 Fellow of the British Academy, 1998
 Honorary Fellow of the Academy of the Hebrew Language, 2011.
 Lidzbarski Gold Medal for Semitic philology, 2004.
 Fellow of Academia Europaea, 2014.
 Honorary Member of the American Oriental Society, 2015.
 Honorary Doctorate, Hebrew University of Jerusalem, 2017.
 Honorary Doctorate, University of Uppsala, 2018.

Works

References 

Regius Professors of Hebrew (Cambridge)
1958 births
British Hebraists
Syriacists
Fellows of the British Academy
Alumni of SOAS University of London
Fellows of Wolfson College, Cambridge
Living people